Scopa is a comune (municipality) in the Province of Vercelli in the Italian region Piedmont, located about  northeast of Turin and about  northwest of Vercelli.

Scopa borders the following municipalities: Balmuccia, Boccioleto, Guardabosone, Postua, Scopello, and Vocca.

References

Cities and towns in Piedmont